Marvin Brown (born 11 May 1974) is a Honduran footballer. He played in four matches for the Honduras national football team in 2001. He was also part of Honduras's squad for the 2001 Copa América tournament.

References

External links
 

1974 births
Living people
Honduran footballers
Honduras international footballers
Place of birth missing (living people)
Association football forwards